Justinianopolis may refer to several cities named after Justinian I or Justinian II:

Europe
Justinianopolis in Cyprus, a former name of Salamis, Cyprus
Justinianopolis (Epirus), a town of ancient Epirus, now in Albania
Justinianopolis in Macedonia, a former name of Kastoria, Greece
Justinianopolis (Thrace), a town of ancient Thrace, near modern Istanbul

Asia
Justinianopolis in Armenia, a former name of Erzincan, Turkey
Justinianopolis in Bithynia, a former name of Günüören, Turkey
Justinianopolis in Cappadocia, a former name of Kırşehir, Turkey
Justinianopolis in Caria, a former name of Didim, Turkey
Justinianopolis in Cilicia, a former name of Anavarza, Turkey
Justinianopolis in Galatia, a former name of Sivrihisar, Turkey
Justinianopolis in Phoenicia, a former name of Huwwarin, Syria
Justinianopolis in Phrygia, a former name of Pepuza, Turkey
Justinianopolis in Pisidia, a later name of Conana, now in Turkey
Justinianopolis in Syria, a former name of Burqush, Syria

Africa
Justinianopolis in Africa, a former name of Sousse, Tunisia
Justinianopolis in Africa, a former name of Chebba, Tunisia
Justinianopolis in Egypt, a former name of Qift, Egypt

See also 
 Justiniana